Two classes of British Royal Navy gunboats have been named Bramble-class gunboats:

 
 

Ship classes of the Royal Navy